Folk theorem may refer to:

 Folk theorem (game theory), a general feasibility theorem
 Ethnomathematics, the study of the relationship between mathematics and culture
 Mathematical folklore, theorems that are widely known to mathematicians but cannot be traced back to an individual

Mathematics disambiguation pages